Gerard Kearns (born 4 October 1984) is an English actor.

Career 

Kearns starred in the film The Mark of Cain, for Film4 Productions, based on British soldiers' abuse of Iraqi prisoners. It premiered at the International Film Festival Rotterdam in February 2007.

He has also starred in the short films Grandad and The 10th Man and has appeared in a number of TV shows such as The Commander starring Amanda Burton. In 2007, he appeared in the videos for The View's double A-side "The Don" and "Skag Trendy". In 2011, he also featured as a voice over for BBC's GCSE Bitesize Revision.

Kearns was cast in the second series of the BBC 1 daytime show Moving On. The episode "Trust", directed by Illy, tells the story of Kearns's character Jack, who is caught trying to burgle the house of elderly ex-boxer Eddie, played by Roy Marsden.

He has also made several appearances in The Accrington Pals, a play by Peter Whelan, portraying the character Ralph, a young volunteer officer during the First World War. He also starred opposite Matthew Kelly in the West End play Sign of the Times.

Kearns also starred in the BBC drama Our World War, marking the centenary of the First World War and as Halig in the series The Last Kingdom.

Personal life
From Mossley, near Ashton-under-Lyne, Greater Manchester, he was educated in Oldham at St Augustine's Catholic School.
He later studied at Ashton Sixth Form College in Ashton-under-Lyne. He is a supporter of Manchester City F.C.

He has been married to Sarah Kearns since 30 December 2017. Together they have two sons, Aidan and James.

Filmography

Television

Film

References

External links

1984 births
English male television actors
Living people
People from Mossley
Male actors from Manchester
21st-century English male actors
English male film actors